The following highways are numbered 564:

Canada
 Alberta Highway 564
 Manitoba Provincial Road 564
 Ontario Highway 564

Ireland 
 R564 regional road

United States